Erma is a fantasy-dark comedy slice of life webtoon created by Mexican artist Brandon J. Santiago. The follows the adventures and misadventures of the titular eight-year-old Erma Williams' experiences as a half-human, half-yōkai/half-ghost, tending to use her haunting abilities for everyday antics, whether for better or for worse, focusing on themes such as friendship and acceptance.  Santiago initially published the webcomic on DeviantArt and Tumblr in May 2014, but has since released it on various services from January 2016, such as Tapas and WEBTOON. It is available in two languages, English and Spanish. In January 2020, Comics Beat reported that with 64.5 million views and 74.9 thousand subscribers, Erma was the most-viewed webcomic on the Tapas syndicate in 2019.

In October 2017, Santiago published a prequel graphic novel to the series titled Spirit's Bloom, as well as two anthology collections of Erma comics, in addition releasing a short film pilot of Erma produced by Outcast Studios. In January 2019, a print collection, Tales of Outcast, was announced, as well as the stand-alone Night Detective, Siris, and Warrior Unicorn Princess, and Yokai, an in-universe novel. A picture book, Meet Erma, was released in April 2020.

Overview
Erma follows the adventures and misadventures of Erma Williams, a child who lives in the suburbs of the fictional town Blairwood and has supernatural abilities. Santiago also focuses on Erma's supernatural life and friendships with her best friends, Amy, Terry and Connor, as well as her babysitter Felicia and fellow Warrior Unicorn Princess fan Sidney.

Characters
Erma Williams: The titular protagonist of the series; she is  a half-human/half-yokai hybrid.
Emiko Williams: Erma’s mother 
Samuel Willaims: Erma’s father
Amy: One of the Erma's friends
Felica: Erma's current babysitter and sister of Erma’s friend Silvia.
Terry: One of Erma’s friends.
Connor: One of Erma's friends; he has a crush on her.
Sirus: An undead ghost dog who is the reincarnation of Osrirs.
Wallace: A demonic dummy who is the first major villain in the series.
The Invisible Man:The Main antagonist of Spirit bloom and a recurring character in the main series.
Sidney: A human rat hybrid.
Osamu Yureimoto:The Patriach of the yureimoto family.
Yokai Trio: a pair of villainous yokai.
Yokai Kids: builled kids who wants revenge against the yureimoto family
Connoer's sister: erma former babysitter.

Development
Santiago started creating and uploading Erma on DeviantArt and Tumblr in 2014. He was studying at the University of Illinois at Urbana–Champaign at the time, from which he graduated in 2018 to work on the webcomic full-time. The concept of the series originated from a short parody one-shot of Ju-On and The Ring published on May 28, 2014. Following the one-shot's positive reception on DeviantArt and it subsequently going viral across various social media platforms, Santiago decided to develop a series based on the original Erma one-shot, debuting on Tapas on January 3, 2016, and on WEBTOON on April 14, 2018. The series has received universal acclaim for its originality, creativity, and humor. In 2017, the name of the series was confirmed to have been taken from the minor  Teenage Mutant Ninja Turtles character Irma Langinstein, and that the surname of Erma title character Erma Williams was taken from the minor The Grudge character Emma Williams.

In October 2017, Santiago developed and released an animated short film based on the comic in conjunction with the company Outcast Studios, run by Donovan Tracy Gaiter and Julia Santiago. Santiago has stated regarding the initial decision to exclusively release the strip on Tapas that "Erma should at least be on one main website where it would be easy for anyone, fan or newcomer, to come together, and be able to read all of the comics in chronological order, with a more organized list"; despite this, the comic was later released on WEBTOON.

Bibliography

Collections
Several print collections and a graphic novel have been published. Erma #1 covered various strips from 2014-2015 alongside original strips, while Erma #2 featured solely original strips. Spirit’s Bloom, a graphic novel set before the events of Erma, detailing how Erma's parents met as well as expanding the series’ mythology, was released in 2017. A third collection, Tales of Outcast, featuring the writing of Donovan Tracy and art of Erik Lervold and Kirsten Celander, was released in 2019.

Graphic novel

Novel

Picture book

Other media

Pilot (2017)

On November 27, 2015, Brandon Santiago confirmed that an animation based on Erma was in development for after the release of Erma #2 via his Tumblr page. On October 2, 2017, Santiago revealed that he had a "secret" project in development in addition to Erma #3, which he cited as the reason "there [wouldn’t] be as many Halloween strips this month as last year". On October 30, 2017, Erma – Animated Short Film was uploaded to YouTube by Santiago, with a notification on Tapas describing the film as "a surprise for all of you", referring to fans of the Erma series. The film was produced by Outcast Studios, and has received a positive reception. The film is set prior to the first Erma strip, detailing how Erma's teacher Ms. Bierly met Erma. The short partially adapts "Coming Soon", a stand-alone comic released to Santiago's DeviantArt and Tumblr pages to announce the development of an ongoing Erma series prior to the series' original launch.

Video game (2021)
On August 11, 2016, Santiago designed and released a videogame based on the Erma as a series of levels through Super Mario Maker, a game creation system developed and published by Nintendo for the Wii U and Nintendo 3DS. The game, titled Erma’s Well of Horror, contains several images of Erma composed of darkness and clouds, and has a completion rate of 4.94%. Promotional art for the game features Mario encountering Erma as he's about to enter a Warp Pipe, shocked by her appearance. Santiago has stated that the game was specifically designed for readers of the Erma webcomic, as compensation for a temporary delay in the release of the following strip that existed at the time. An updated version of Erma’s Well of Horror was later released to Super Mario Maker 2 upon its release in 2019. In March 2019, point-and-click adventure game Erma: The Game was announced to be in development for iOS and Mac, following Erma as she searches her neighborhood of Blairwood for her science project gone awry, with an Indiegogo campaign to fund the game's development raising €24,550 for a December 2021 release.

Reception
Brad Miska of Bloody Disgusting has described the quality of the series as being on par with, if not superior to, Calvin and Hobbes, stating that not since the series "have I been this excited about an ongoing series". Miska also cited Santiago as having been "working diligently" with Erma; Miska additionally mistook the character of Emiko Williams (née Yūreimoto) for Samara Morgan in his review, the character from whom the design for Erma was gotten (alongside Kayako Saeki). In a follow-up review to that of Miska's for Bloody Disgusting, Jonathan Barkan described Erma as "adorable" and "innocent", expressing fondness the series' "squeal-inducing" moments and citing "Movie Night" as his favourite strip.

Giallo Julian of Dread Central praised Erma as "just wholesome, feel-good content dipped in a nice coating of horror imagery… and you can bet your bloody guts that [one would] love every single bit of it. It’s a celebration of the horror culture in the style of an old Peanuts comic strip", in particular praising its evolution from "one-shot stories establishing Erma [to] longer narratives, and [how] it begins to flesh out a creative world that [is] just a joy to see."

Harry Situation of The Prose described Erma as an "[a]bsolutely fun read", calling the series "by far one of the best comic strips I’ve ever read", citing his love for Santiago's method of characterization of the main characters, finding "the rest of the characters [to be] just as likable too", describing the characters of Sam and Emiko Williams as "the most lovable couple ever". Regarding the series' artwork, Situation described it as "incredible", saying "[t]here's so much attention to detail that it’s mind-blowing. I love the expressions people give in the comic whenever Erma does something freaky. Their drawn faces and reactions are just priceless. Even Erma’s expressions are entertaining. While she doesn't talk throughout the series, Brandon found a way to let her mood and thoughts let the readers know what she's saying, and this method is brilliant. Also, it's nice to spot some cameos and easter eggs of classic horror movies in each comic strip."

Chase Magnett of BuzzFeed described the series overall as "[to] be read by people of all ages", describing its humour and artwork as "adorable". Regarding the series' content, Magnett referred to Erma as "contain[ing] practical information for everyday life", "teach[ing] kids that actions have consequences", and "laugh[ing] at the day-to-day concerns of parenthood", overall stating the series to have "something that everyone can relate to". Deanna Destito of Comics Beat praised Santiago's depiction of the titular Erma Williams as a "ghoulish creeper [who] just wants to be like any other kid", complementing the series' contrast with such horror franchises as The Grudge, and describing the series overall as "quirky, cute, and even a little heartwarming".

See also

 Portrayal of women in comics
 Ju-On franchise
 The Ring franchise

References

External links
 
 
 Erma on Tapas
 Erma on WEBTOON
 Erma on Tumblr
 Erma on Reddit
 Erma on DeviantArt

2010s webcomics
2010s webtoons
American webcomics
American comic strips
Webcomics in print
Webtoons
2014 webcomic debuts
Fictional characters introduced in 2014
Fictional characters who can duplicate themselves
Fictional characters introduced in 2016
Child characters in literature
Comics characters with accelerated healing
Tapastic webcomics
Comics about women
Creative Commons-licensed comics
Yōkai in popular culture
Gag-a-day comics
Fictional spiritual mediums
2016 webcomic debuts
Interracial romance novels
Characters in American novels of the 21st century
Fictional characters with death or rebirth abilities